Enzo Plazzotta (29 May 1921 – 12 October 1981) was an Italian-born British sculptor.

Plazzotta was born in Mestre, near Venice, and spent his working life in London.  He is best remembered for a fascination with and study of movement in bronze - the human form, horses, ballerinas, and for his female studies, many of which adorn London's streets.
He died in London, aged 60.

Works
Public works include:

Camargue Horses stands on the Waterside Terrace at the Barbican Centre, London
The Crucifixion in the College Gardens of Westminster Abbey.
Homage to Leonardo stands in Belgrave Square, London.
Jeté, 1975, on the corner of 46-57 Millbank, Westminster, London (based on David Wall).
The Hand of Christ stands in front of Dinand Library at the College of the Holy Cross, Worcester, Massachusetts 
The Helmet,(1964) in front of Lewes Priory; commissioned by Sir Tufton Beamish
Two Brothers - Boys Town, Nebraska. 
Young Dancer sits opposite the Royal Opera House in Broad Street, off Bow Street, London.

References

External links
 
Plazzotta Sculpture website

1921 births
1981 deaths
Sculptors from Venice
20th-century Italian sculptors
20th-century Italian male artists
Italian male sculptors
Modern sculptors
20th-century British sculptors
British male sculptors
Italian emigrants to the United Kingdom
20th-century British male artists